The following is a list of courts and tribunals in Victoria:

 Supreme Court of Victoria
 Court of Appeal of the Supreme Court of Victoria
 Commercial Court
 Common Law Division of the Supreme Court of Victoria
 Criminal Law Division of the Supreme Court of Victoria
 County Court of Victoria
 Magistrates' Court of Victoria
 Victorian Civil and Administrative Tribunal
 Koori Court
 Children's Court of Victoria
 Coroners Court of Victoria

Lists of courts and tribunals in Australia

Courts and tribunals